is a passenger railway station in the city of Abiko, Chiba Prefecture Japan, operated by the East Japan Railway Company (JR East).

Lines
Kohoku Station is served by the Jōban Line, and is located 34.0 kilometers from the terminus of branch line at nippori Station.

Station layout
Tennōdai Station has two island platforms serving four tracks, connected by a footbridge. The station is staffed.

Platforms

History
Tennōdai Station was opened on April 20, 1971 as a station on the Japan National Railways (JNR). The station was absorbed into the JR East network upon the privatization of the JNR on April 1, 1987.

Passenger statistics
In fiscal 2019, the station was used by an average of 19,271 passengers daily.

Surrounding area
 Chuo Gakuen High School

See also
 List of railway stations in Japan

References

External links

   JR East Station information  

Railway stations in Chiba Prefecture
Railway stations in Japan opened in 1971
Jōban Line
Abiko, Chiba